The thintail skate (Dipturus leptocauda) is a species of fish in the family Rajidae. It is endemic to Brazil.  Its natural habitat is open seas.

References
 

thintail skate
Fish of Brazil
Endemic fauna of Brazil
thintail skate
Taxonomy articles created by Polbot
Taxobox binomials not recognized by IUCN